Korai-ye Olya (also Romanized as Korā’ī-ye ‘Olyā and Kara’i Olya; also known as Korāhī ‘Olyā, Korāhī-ye ‘Olyā, and Korā’ī-ye Bālā) is a village in Shahid Modarres Rural District, in the Central District of Shushtar County, Khuzestan Province, Iran. At the 2006 census, its population was 67, in 18 families.

References 

Populated places in Shushtar County